The Life of a Song is the debut studio album from American country music duo Joey + Rory. The album was released on October 28, 2008 via Vanguard and Sugar Hill Records. It was produced by Carl Jackson. The album features songs which Joey and Rory sang on Can You Duet.

The first single from the album, "Cheater, Cheater" was released in September 2008 and has become a Top 40 hit on the Hot Country Songs charts. This song was previously recorded by the duo Bomshel, whose own version failed to chart earlier in 2008. "Play the Song" and "To Say Goodbye" followed in March and July 2009, respectively. Also included is a cover of Lynyrd Skynyrd's "Free Bird".

The song "Sweet Emmylou" was named the best country song of 2008 by country music blog Engine 145. The song was previously recorded by co-writer Catherine Britt as a hidden track of her album Little Wildflower.

Track listing

Personnel

Joey + Rory
 Rory Feek - acoustic guitar, vocals
 Joey Feek - vocals

Additional Musicians
 Tony Creasman - drums
 Kevin "Swine" Grantt - bass guitar
 Aubrey Haynie - baritone violin, fiddle, mandolin
 Rob Ickes - dobro, lap steel guitar, Weissenborn
 Carl Jackson - banjo, acoustic guitar, background vocals
 Mike Johnson - steel guitar
 Kirk "Jelly Roll" Johnson - harmonica
 Catherine Marx - piano, synthesizer strings
 Bryan Sutton - acoustic guitar
 Ilya Toshinsky - acoustic guitar, baritone guitar, electric guitar
 Guthrie Trapp - electric guitar
 Bradley Walker - background vocals

Chart performance
The Life of a Song debuted at #10 on the Top Country albums and at #61 on the Billboard 200, selling approximately 8,000 copies in the first week. As of April 2010, the album has sold 215,000 copies.

Weekly charts

Year-end charts

References

2008 debut albums
Vanguard Records albums
Joey + Rory albums
Sugar Hill Records albums